Pesik stands for Persatuan Sepakbola Indonesia Kuningan (en: Football Association of Indonesia Kuningan). Pesik Kuningan is an  Indonesian football club based in Kuningan, West Java. They currently compete in the Liga 3.

Pesik stadium is Mashud Wisnusaputra Stadium. Its location was in downtown Kuningan, West Java.

References

External links
Pesik Kuningan at Liga-Indonesia.co.id

 
Football clubs in Indonesia
Football clubs in West Java
Association football clubs established in 1934
1934 establishments in the Dutch East Indies